The legitimacy of the State of Israel has been questioned by a number of countries and individuals since the Israeli Declaration of Independence in 1948. Specifically, it concerns the matter of whether the authority of Israel over the area in which it exists and/or the areas that it claims should be accepted as legitimate political authority; in the former context, which concerns the legitimacy of Israel in the area of its sovereign existence and not only its authority in the Israeli-occupied territories, the argument becomes couched in terms of its right to exist.

On 11 May 1949, Israel was admitted to the United Nations (UN) as a full member state. However, numerous UN member states have refused to extend diplomatic recognition to the country and likewise have not established diplomatic relations with it. , Israel remains unrecognized by 28 of the  UN member states. Calls to withdraw Israel's international recognition as well as groups carrying out efforts to challenge the legitimacy of Israeli authority have been led primarily by Palestinians and other Arabs in light of the Israeli–Palestinian conflict and broader Arab–Israeli conflict, with significant support from the rest of the Muslim world.

Diplomatic normalization and legitimacy
From an international relations perspective, Israel meets basic standards for legitimacy as a state.

, 30 United Nations member states did not recognise the State of Israel: 13 of the 21 UN members in the Arab League: Algeria, Comoros, Djibouti, Iraq, Kuwait, Lebanon, Libya, Qatar, Saudi Arabia, Somalia, Syria, Tunisia, and Yemen; a further nine members of the Organisation of Islamic Cooperation: Afghanistan, Bangladesh, Brunei, Indonesia, Iran, Malaysia, Mali, Niger, and Pakistan; and Cuba, North Korea and Venezuela. On the other hand, nine members of the Arab League recognise Israel: Bahrain, Egypt, Jordan, Mauritania, Morocco, Oman, Sudan, United Arab Emirates and Palestine; and most of the non-Arab members of Organisation of Islamic Cooperation also recognise Israel.

In the 1990s, Islamic and leftist movements in Jordan attacked the Israel–Jordan Treaty of Peace as legitimization. Significant minorities in Jordan see Israel as an illegitimate state, and reversing the normalization of diplomatic relations was central to Jordanian discourse.

In 2002 the Arab League unanimously adopted the Arab Peace Initiative at their Beirut summit. The comprehensive peace plan called for full normalization of Arab-Israeli relations in return for full Israeli withdrawal from the territories occupied in June 1967. Turki al-Faisal of Saudi Arabia said that in endorsing the initiative every Arab state had "made clear that they will pay the price for peace, not only by recognising Israel as a legitimate state in the area, but also to normalise relations with it and end the state of hostilities that had existed since 1948."

Palestinian Authority and Hamas

Following the Oslo I Accord in 1993, the Palestinian Authority and Israel conditionally recognized each other's right to govern specific areas of the country. This boosted Israel's legal authority and legitimacy on the international stage. Palestinian Authority leader Mahmoud Abbas said while speaking at the UN regarding Palestinian recognition, "We did not come here seeking to delegitimize a state established years ago, and that is Israel."

Hamas, in contrast, does not recognize Israel as a legitimate government. Furthermore, Hamas denies the legitimacy of the Oslo I Accord.

Rhetoric of delegitimization
Following the Palestinian legislative election of 2006 and Hamas' governance of the Gaza Strip, the term "delegitimisation" has been frequently applied to rhetoric surrounding the Israeli–Palestinian conflict.

Legitimacy rhetoric as antisemitism
Delegitimization is seen by some observers to be a double standard which separates Israel from other legitimate nations which have imperfect government. Natan Sharansky, head of the Jewish Agency, discussed a 3D Test for determining new antisemitism. The third of the three D's is delegitimization. He explains "when Israel's fundamental right to exist is denied – alone among all peoples in the world – this too is anti-Semitism."

Dore Gold, President of the Israeli think tank Jerusalem Center for Public Affairs (JCPA), believes there is a "campaign to delegitimize Israel" based on three themes, a "denial of Israel's right to security", "portrayal of Israel as a criminal state", and "denial of Jewish history". Elhanan Yakira, professor of philosophy at the Hebrew University of Jerusalem, also considers portrayal of Israel as "criminal" and denial of Jewish history, specifically the Holocaust, to be key to a delegitimizing narrative. Alan Dershowitz believes that other standard lines of argument include claims of Israel's "colonial" nature, a belief that statehood was not granted "legally", the apartheid analogy, and the necessity of a one-state solution. According to Irwin Cotler, the lopsided number of anti-Israel resolutions passed by the UN is an example of delegitimization.

Canadian ex-Foreign Minister John Baird has characterized Israel's delegitimization as the new antisemitism.

Legitimacy rhetoric as distraction
M.J. Rosenberg, writing in the Los Angeles Times, argued that the term "delegitimization" is a "distraction", whose purpose is to divert attention away from world opposition to the "illegitimate" occupation of the West Bank and blockade of the Gaza Strip, from the "illegal" settlements, and from "the ever-louder calls for Israel to grant Palestinians equal rights". He concludes that "It's not the Palestinians who are delegitimizing Israel, but the Israeli government, which maintains the occupation. And the leading delegitimizer is Netanyahu, whose contemptuous rejection of peace is turning Israel into an international pariah."

Dangers of delegitimization to peace
According to Gerald Steinberg writing for JCPA, attacks on Israel's legitimacy are a barrier to the Israeli–Palestinian peace process. Amos Yadlin, former head of Israeli intelligence said that "delegitimization of Israel is a graver threat than war." Thomas Friedman, writing in The New York Times, says "for 100 years, through violence and delegitimization, Israelis and Palestinians have made sure that the other was never allowed to really feel at home in Israel." Delegitimization of the adversary, among all the psychological themes, is said to be "one of the major detrimental forces that turns a conflict to be vicious and violent, while preventing its peaceful resolution."
 
US President Barack Obama said in a May 2011 speech "for the Palestinians, efforts to delegitimize Israel will end in failure. Symbolic actions to isolate Israel at the United Nations in September won't create an independent state." In 2012, the president said, "whenever an effort is made to delegitimize the State of Israel, my administration has opposed them." Irwin Cotler, former Canadian Attorney General, said that delegitimization is "masked under the current discourse". It is hidden in the anti-Israel resolutions passed by the UN, universal jurisdiction is "often abused" regarding Israel, it is "laundered under the cover of human rights", and is hidden behind the use of accusations of racism and apartheid.

Delegitimization is seen as a threat to Israel's security. Demands for Israel to not enter into Gaza and defeat Hamas during Operation Pillar of Defense are characterized by David Schwartz as a "delegitimization of Israel's right to defend itself." Tzipi Livni said that "the threat of delegitimization intensifies other threats facing Israel, and limits our ability to protect ourselves."

Legitimacy and Israeli uniqueness
Professor Emanuel Adler of the University of Toronto considers Israel as willing to accept a situation where its legitimacy may be challenged, because it sees itself as occupying a unique place in the world order. Stacie E. Goddard of Wellesley College argues that the legitimacy of Israeli historical narratives is used as a tool to secure territory.

See also
 
Antisemitism in the anti-globalization movement
Antisemitism in the Arab world
Anti-Zionism
Timeline of Anti-Zionism
Criticism of Israel
New antisemitism
Political status
Self-determination
United Nations General Assembly Resolution 3379
Zionist entity

References

External links
 Delegitimation of Israel and Israel Attachments Among Jewish Young Adults: The College Campus and Other Contributing Factors, a paper by The Jewish People Policy Institute

Politics of Israel
Foreign relations of Israel
Anti-Zionism
Zionism
Israeli–Palestinian conflict